Mexico does not have an official language but Spanish is the de facto national language spoken by the vast majority of the population, making Mexico the world's most populous Hispanophone country. The indigenous languages are from eleven language families, including four isolates and one that immigrated from the United States. The Mexican government recognizes 69 national languages, 63 of which are indigenous, including around 350 dialects of those languages. The large majority of the population is monolingual in Spanish. Some immigrant and indigenous populations are bilingual, while some indigenous people are monolingual in their languages. Mexican Sign Language is spoken by much of the deaf population, and there are one or two indigenous sign languages as well. 

The government of Mexico uses Spanish in most official purposes, but in terms of legislation, its status is not that of an official primary language. The Law of Linguistic Rights establishes Spanish as one of the country's national languages, along with 63 distinct indigenous languages (from seven large families, plus four counted as language isolates). The law, made widely known in 2003, requires the state to offer all of its services to its indigenous citizens in their mother tongues, but in practice this is not yet the case. Note that, as defined by mutual intelligibility, the number of spoken languages in Mexico is much greater than the 63 national languages, because National Institute of Indigenous Languages (INALI) counts distinct ethnic groups for the purposes of political classification. For instance, the Mixtec are a single ethnicity and therefore count as a single language for governmental/legal purposes, but there are a dozen distinct Mixtec dialect regions, each of which includes at least one variety that is not mutually intelligible with those of the other dialect regions (Josserand, 1983), and Ethnologue counts 52 varieties of Mixtec that require separate literature. Ethnologue currently counts 282 indigenous languages currently spoken in Mexico, plus a number of immigrant languages (Lewis et al. 2018).

Due to the long history of marginalization of indigenous groups, most indigenous languages are endangered, with some languages expected to become extinct within years or decades, and others simply having populations that grow slower than the national average. According to the Commission for the Development of Indigenous Peoples (CDI) and National Institute of Indigenous Languages (INALI), while 10–14% of the population identifies as belonging to an indigenous group, around 6% speak an indigenous language.

Language history

From the arrival of the first Franciscan missionaries, Spanish, Latin, and indigenous languages played parts in the evangelization of Mexico. Many sixteenth-century churchmen studied indigenous languages in order to instruct native peoples in Christian doctrine. The same men also found Castilian and Latin appropriate in certain contexts. All told, there existed a kind of "linguistic coexistence" from the beginning of the colonial period.

Some monks and priests attempted to describe and classify indigenous languages with Spanish. Philip II of Spain decreed in 1570 that Nahuatl become the official language of the colonies of New Spain in order to facilitate communication between the natives of the colonies.

In 1696 Charles II reversed that policy and banned the use of any languages other than Spanish throughout New Spain. Beginning in the 18th century, decrees ordering the Hispanization of indigenous populations became more numerous and Spanish colonizers no longer learned the indigenous languages.

After independence the government initiated an educational system with the primary aim of Hispanization of the native populations. This policy was based on the idea that this would help the indigenous peoples become a more integrated part of the new Mexican nation.

Except for the Second Mexican Empire, led by the Habsburg Maximilian I, no Mexican government tried to prevent the loss of indigenous languages during the 19th century.

In 1889, Antonio García Cubas estimated that 38% of Mexicans spoke an indigenous language, down from 60% in 1820. By the end of the 20th century, this figure had fallen to 6%.

For most of the 20th century successive governments denied native tongues the status of valid languages. Indigenous students were forbidden to speak their native languages in school and were often punished for doing so.

In 2002, Mexico's constitution was amended to reinforce the nation's pluricultural nature by giving the State the obligation to protect and nurture the expressions of this diversity. On June 14, 1999, the Council of Writers in Indigenous Languages presented Congress with a document entitled "Suggested legal initiatives towards linguistic rights of indigenous peoples and communities", with the goal of beginning to protect the linguistic rights of indigenous communities. The Ley General de Derechos Lingüísticos de los Pueblos Indígenas was passed in March 2003, establishing a framework for the conservation, nurturing and development of indigenous languages. Critics claim that the law's complexity makes enforcement difficult.

Indigenous languages

Spanish is the de facto national language spoken by the vast majority of Mexicans, though it is not defined as an official language in legislation. The second article of the 1917 Constitution defines the country as multicultural, recognizes the right of the indigenous peoples to "preserve and enrich their languages" and promotes "bilingual and intercultural education".

In 2003, the Mexican Congress approved the General Law of Linguistic Rights of the Indigenous Peoples, which is a law that recognizes that Mexico's history makes its indigenous languages "national languages". Accordingly, they "have the same validity [as Spanish] in their territory, location and context". At the same time, legislators made no specific provisions for the official or legal status of the Spanish language. This law means that indigenous peoples can use their native language in communicating with government officials and request official documents in that language. The Mexican state supports the preservation and promotion of the use of the national languages through the activities of the National Institute of Indigenous Languages.

Mexico has about six million citizens who speak indigenous languages. That is the second-largest group in the Americas after Peru. However, a relatively small percentage of Mexico's population speaks an indigenous language compared to other countries in the Americas, such as Guatemala (42.8%), Peru (35%), and even Ecuador (9.4%), Panama (8.3%), Paraguay and Bolivia.

The only indigenous language spoken by more than a million people in Mexico is the Nahuatl language; the other Native American languages with a large population of native speakers (at least 400,000 speakers) include Yucatec Maya, Tzeltal Maya, Tzotzil Maya, Mixtec, and Zapotec.

Language endangerment 

According to the Law of Linguistic Rights, Mexico recognizes sixty-two indigenous languages as co-official National languages.  With Spanish being the dominant language, Mexico has become a site for endangered languages. "Indigenous people’s disadvantaged socioeconomic status and the pressure of assimilation into mestizo society have been influential on indigenous language loss." The result of the conflict between indigenous languages and Spanish has been a language shift in Mexico from indigenous languages being spoken to more people using Spanish in every domain. Due to this situation there have been many language revitalization strategies implemented in order to create a language shift to try to reverse this language shift. Literature projects done with the Nahua people  include "Keeping the fire alive: a decade of language revitalization in Mexico" showing the experiences of language revitalization in South Mexico.

Classification

The following is a classification of the 65 indigenous languages grouped by family:

Language families with members north of Mexico

 Algonquian languages: Kikapú
 Yuman–Cochimí languages: Paipai, Kiliwa, Cucapá, Cochimi and Kumiai
Uto-Aztecan languages:
 Tepiman branch: Pápago, Pima Bajo, Northern and Southern Tepehuán
Taracahita branch: Tarahumara, Guarijio language, Yaqui and Mayo
Corachol branch: Cora and Huichol
 Nahuan branch: Nahuatl, Nahuan dialects
Na-Dene languages: Lipan, Mezcalero, Chiricahua, Western Apache

Language families with all known members in Mexico
 Totonacan languages:
Totonac (different varieties)
Tepehua (different varieties)
Oto-Manguean languages:
 Oto-pamean branch: Northern Pame, Southern Pame, Chichimeca Jonaz, Otomí, Mazahua, Matlatzinca and Ocuiltec.
Popolocan branch: Popoloca language, Chocho, Ixcatec language*, Mazatecan languages
 Tlapanec–Subtiaban branch: Me'phaa
Amuzgoan branch: Amuzgo de Guerrero, Amuzgo de Oaxaca
Mixtecan branch: Mixtecan languages, Cuicatec and Trique language.
Zapotecan branch: Chatino languages, Zapotec languages.
Chinantec branch: Chinantec languages
Chiapaneca–Mangue branch: Chiapaneco*
 Mixe–Zoquean languages:
Zoque languages
Mixe languages
Popoluca (Texistepec Popoluca, Sierra Popoluca (Both Zoquean) and Sayula Popoluca Oluta Popoluca (Both Mixean))

Language family with members south of Mexico
 Mayan languages:
 Huastecan branch: Wastek language,
Yucatecan branch: Yukatek Maya, Lacandón,
Cholan branch: Ch'ol language, Chontal Maya language, Tzeltal language, Tzotzil language,
 Qanjobalan–Chujean branch: Chuj language, Tojolabal language, Q'anjob'al language, Jakaltek, Motozintlec, Akatek language
Quichean–Mamean branch: Mam language, Tektitek language, Ixil, Kʼicheʼ language, Kaqchikel and Q'eqchi'.

Language isolates:
 Seri
 Tequistlatecan languages: Lowland Chontal, Highland Chontal
 Purépecha
 Huave
*In danger of extinction.

Other languages

The deaf community uses Mexican Sign Language, Yucatan Sign Language, and, in northern Baja California, American Sign Language.

The non-indigenous languages spoken in Mexico include English (by English-speaking as well as by the residents of border states). One example of this group is of the American Mormon colony of Nueva Casas Grandes in Chihuahua, which settled in the late 19th century. German (spoken mainly in Mexico City and Puebla), Greek (spoken mainly in Mexico City,  Guadalajara and especially in Sinaloa state), Arabic, Venetian (in Chipilo), Italian, French, Occitan, Catalan, Basque, Galician, Asturian, Filipino, Polish, Hebrew, Korean, Ladino, Plautdietsch, Armenian, Japanese, Chinese and other languages are spoken by smaller numbers. Some of these languages (Venetian and Plautdietsch) are spoken in isolated communities or villages. The rest are spoken by immigrants or their descendants who tend to live in the larger cities and towns.

As far as second languages go, many educated Mexicans (and those with little education who have immigrated to the US and returned) have different degrees of fluency in English. Many Mexicans working in the tourist industry can speak some English.

In a study conducted by the Alliance française in 2019 revealed that Mexicans have begun to take a greater interest in studying the French language, with 250,000 people being French speakers and 350,000 learning French.

Romani is spoken by the Mexican Roma minority.

See also

 List of Mexican states by indigenous-speaking population
 Pura López Colomé

References

External links
 CDI
 "¿Qué lengua hablas?", a portal that contains multimedia files of phrases spoken in some of the national indigenous languages
  National Institute of Indigenous Languages / in Spanish
 Ethnologue report for Mexico
 General Law of Linguistic Rights of Indigenous Peoples (in Spanish)

 
Mexican culture